Out of Darkness is the first studio album from In the Midst of Lions. Strike First Records released the album on May 26, 2009.

Critical reception

Awarding the album three and a half stars from Jesus Freak Hideout, Scott Fryberger states, "despite the album's brevity, the seven full songs definitely give the listener a good look into who they are, musically and lyrically." Chris W., giving the album four stars for Indie Vision Music, writes, "One of the best praise and worship based metal releases available. This debut is sure to bring scene wide recognition to In The Midst Of Lions not just for its music, but for its message as well."

Track listing

References

2009 debut albums
In the Midst of Lions albums
Facedown Records albums